Arghavan Khosravi (born 1984) is an Iranian-born American visual artist, and illustrator. She is known for her three dimensional paintings with works that cross between the traditions of European Renaissance and Persian miniature; with themes of freedom, exile, and empowerment. Khosravi lives in Stamford, Connecticut, and previously lived in Natick, Massachusetts.

Early life and education 
Arghavan Khosravi was born in 1984 in Shahr-e Kord, Chaharmahal and Bakhtiari Province, Iran, and was raised in a secular household in Tehran. In part due to Iranian societal issues in the aftermath of the Iranian Revolution, at an early age she was made aware of the distinct difference between public and private spaces. The theme of the compartmentalized self was one that carried on in her later-made artwork. 

Khosravi earned a BFA degree (2006) in graphic design from Islamic Azad University; an MFA degree (2009) in illustration from the University of Tehran; and a MFA degree (2018) in painting from Rhode Island School of Design. Several years after attending the University of Tehran, Khosravi worked as a graphic designer and children's book illustrator. She has illustrated around 20 books. She was detained by the morality police in 2011. In 2015, she moved to the United States to finish her education. She attended a one-year postbaccalaureate program at Brandeis University.

Career 
In her artwork, she juxtaposes contradictions in her images between freedom and restraints; and they often feature dream-like colorful and whimsical gardens, and something disturbing happening such as someone purposely limiting or obstructing the freedom of the female subject's bodily movement. She uses traditional Persian textile patterns in many of her paintings. Hair as a symbol has been used in many of her works; which a global audience took notice to after the Mahsa Amini protests in 2022.  

In 2019, Khosravi had her first solo exhibition in a gallery at Lyles & King in New York City.  In April to September 2022, she held her first solo museum exhibition at the Currier Museum of Art in Manchester, New Hampshire. Other notable exhibitions include Rachel Uffner gallery (2021) in New York City; Rockefeller Center (2022); Kavi Gupta Gallery (2022) in Chicago; and Stems Gallery (2022) in Belgium.

Her work is in public museum collections including at the Newport Art Museum, the Pennsylvania Academy of the Fine Arts Museum, and RISD Museum.

See also 

 List of Iranian women artists

References

External links 
 Official website
 Video: Open Studio Full Show: April 22, 2022 from GBH-TV on YouTube
 Article: Muslim Ban Made Personal (2017) by Simone Solondz, RISD News
 Podcast: Arghavan Khosravi, Tavan Studio in Conversation (January 26, 2020)

1984 births
Living people
Iranian emigrants to the United States
Islamic Azad University alumni
University of Tehran alumni
Rhode Island School of Design alumni
American women painters
Iranian women painters
American women sculptors
Iranian women sculptors
People from Chaharmahal and Bakhtiari Province
Mahsa Amini protests
Artists from Stamford, Connecticut